Volleyball has been part of the Summer Olympics program for both men and women consistently since 1964.

Brazil, the United States and the former Soviet Union are the only teams to win multiple gold medals at the men's tournament since its introduction. The remaining six editions of the Men's Olympic Volleyball Tournament were won each by a different country including Japan, Poland, Netherlands, Russia, France, and the defunct Yugoslavia.

Gold medals are less evenly distributed in women's volleyball than in men's; the fifteen editions of the Women's Olympic Volleyball Tournament were won by only six countries: Brazil, Cuba, China, Japan, the United States and the former Soviet Union.

History

Origins
The history of Olympic volleyball can be traced back to the 1924 Summer Olympics in Paris, where volleyball was played as part of an American sports demonstration event. Its addition to the Olympic program, however, was given only after World War II, with the foundation of the FIVB and of some of the continental confederations. In 1957, a special tournament was held during the 53rd IOC session in Sofia, Bulgaria, to support such request. The competition was a success, and the sport was officially introduced in 1964. The International Olympic Committee attempted to drop volleyball for the 1968 Olympics, but this was met with protest.

The volleyball Olympic tournament was originally a simple competition, whose format paralleled the one still employed in the World Cup: all teams played against each other team and then were ranked by number of wins, set average and point average. One disadvantage of this round-robin system is that medal winners could be determined before the end of the games, making the audience lose interest in the outcome of the remaining matches.

To cope with this situation, the competition was split into two phases: a "final round" was introduced, consisting of quarterfinals, semifinals and finals. Since its creation in 1972, this new system has become the standard for the volleyball Olympic tournament, and is usually referred to as the "Olympic format".

The number of teams involved in the games has grown steadily since 1964. Since 1996, both men's and women's indoor events count 12 participant nations. Each of the five continental volleyball confederations has at least one affiliated national federation involved in the Olympic Games.

Events

Men's winners

The first two editions of the volleyball Olympic tournament were won by the Soviet Union team. Bronze in 1964 and silver in 1968, Japan won gold in 1972. In 1976, the introduction of a new offensive skill, the back row attack, helped Poland win the competition over the Soviets in a very tight five-setter.

In 1980, many of the strongest teams in men's volleyball belonged to the Eastern Bloc, so the American-led boycott of the 1980 Summer Olympics did not have as great an effect on these events as it had on the women's. The Soviet Union collected their third Olympic gold medal with a 3–1 victory over Bulgaria. With a Soviet-led boycott in 1984, the United States confirmed their new volleyball leadership in the Western World by sweeping smoothly over Brazil at the finals. In that edition a minor nation, Italy, won their first medal, but Italy would rise to prominence in volleyball in later decades. A long-awaited confrontation between the US and Soviet volleyball teams came in the 1988 final: powerplayers Karch Kiraly and Steve Timmons pushed the United States to a second gold medal setting the issue in favor of the Americans.

In 1992, Brazil upset favorites Unified Team, Netherlands, and Italy for their first Olympic championship. Runners-up Netherlands, with Ron Zwerver and Olof van der Meulen, came back in the following edition for a five-set win over Italy. In spite of their success in other major volleyball competitions in the 1990s, Italy did not fare well at the Olympics. After winning bronze in Atlanta, Serbia and Montenegro, led by Vladimir and Nikola Grbić, beat Russia at the final in 2000 to secure the gold (in 1996 and 2000 they played under the name Federal Republic of Yugoslavia).

In 2004, Brazil beat Italy in the final, adding a second gold medal to their record and confirming their role as the men's volleyball superpowers of the 2000s. In 2008, United States beat Brazil in the final, winning their third gold medal. Russia won the bronze for the second time by defeating Italy. In the 2012 final, Russia came back from a 0–2 set deficit, not letting the Brazilians take advantage of any of their 2 match points in the third set. Dmitriy Muserskiy scored 31 points, which is an Olympic Games record in a final. Italy defeated Bulgaria and took Bronze.

After coming up short in the previous two editions of the Olympics as runners-up, the Brazilians captured their third gold medal in the history of the competition playing home in 2016 after their straight-set victory against Italy in the final. The United States pulled off a comeback from a 0–2 deficit to claim the bronze medal with a victory over Russia.

The 2020 tournament, held in 2021 due to the COVID-19 pandemic causing a delay, had the French team of Earvin N'Gapeth win it all over the Russians. In a repeat of the 1988 bronze medal match, Brazil were upset by neighbor Argentina.

Gold medals appear to be more evenly distributed in men's volleyball than in women's: former Soviet Union (three titles), United States (three) and Brazil (three) are the only teams to have won the tournament more than once. The remaining six editions were won each by a different country. Despite being a major force in men's volleyball since the 1990s, and never missing a tournament since 1976 Italy are still the only volleyball powerhouses that lack a gold medal at the Olympic Games.

Women's winners

The opening edition of the volleyball Olympic tournament, in 1964, was won by the host nation Japan. There followed two victories in a row by the Soviet Union, in 1968 and 1972. South Korea were expected to get their first gold after beating Japan in the 1975 Pre-Olympic Games, but Japan came back again in 1976 for one last Olympic gold before losing their status of women's volleyball superpowers.

The American-led boycott of the 1980 Games left many strong volleyball nations like Japan and South Korea out of the games. As a result, the Soviet Union easily secured a third Olympic gold medal. In 1984, the Eastern bloc was, in its turn, boycotting the games, and the Soviet Union did not participate. As a result, host nation United States won its first medals in volleyball, losing the finals to China. With eastern and western nations again involved in the Olympics, the Soviet Union obtained a remarkable victory over Peru after trailing 0–2 in 1988's marking one of the most dramatic female matches of the 20th century. The 1988 games were, however, boycotted by Cuba, who would become the next dominating force.

1992 saw a new force go down in Olympic history: organized under the name Unified Team, the nations of the former Soviet Union that chose to form a combined team easily reached the gold medal game, but did not resist the power play of the young, rising Cuban squad. Led by superstars Mireya Luis and Regla Torres, Cuba would eventually set the record for consecutive wins in the Olympic Games by also taking the gold in 1996 and 2000 against China and Russia, respectively.

In 2004, the winners were once again China. Second were Russia who beat Brazil in a very tough and dramatic semifinal match after being down 1–2, 19–24 in the fourth set.

In 2008, Brazil finally won the gold, beating the United States in the final and losing only one set in the competition. China were awarded the bronze by beating Cuba. After a troubled start, Brazil secured the double gold in 2012 after beating the United States once again in the final. Japan won the bronze medal after defeating South Korea.

In 2016, home team Brazil were favorites to once again win the title, thus equalling Cuba's three consecutive gold medals between 1992 and 2000. After winning all of their preliminary round matches without dropping a set, the team was, however, stunned by a young Chinese squad in a tiebreaker in the quarterfinals. China went on to win the title, their third in Olympic history, by beating Serbia in four sets in the gold medal match. In the process, Lang Ping became the first person to win a gold medal as a player in Los Angeles 1984 and repeat the feat now as a coach in Rio de Janeiro. China also became the first team to win the Olympics after losing three matches in the preliminary round. The United States defeated Netherlands 3–1 to capture the bronze medal.

In the fifteenth edition of the games in 2020, the United States faced Brazil for the third final in four editions, only this time they broke the long title drought. Thus the Americans became only the sixth country to win the women's tournament, after Brazil, China, Cuba, Japan, and the former Soviet Union. Serbia got the bronze, beating South Korea.

Competition formula
The volleyball Olympic tournament has a very stable competition formula. The following rules apply:

 Qualification

Twelve teams participate in each event.
Host nations are always pre-qualified.
Two teams qualify through the Men's and Women's World Cup (this number was reduced from three prior to the 2016 Summer Olympics).
Five teams qualify as winners of continental qualification tournaments.
The four remaining berths are decided in world qualification tournaments.

 Competition format

For the first phase, called qualification round, teams are ranked by the FIVB World Rankings and then divided in two pools of six teams using the serpentine system. The host nation is always ranked 1.
At the qualification round, each team plays one match against all other teams in its pool. Top four teams in each pool advance, the remaining two leave the competition.
At the second phase, usually called final round, teams play quarterfinals, semifinals and finals.
For the final round, matches are organized according to the results obtained in the qualification round. Let the top four teams in each pool be A1, A2, A3, A4 (group A); and B1, B2, B3, B4 (group B). Quarterfinals would then be: A1xB4; A2xB3; A3xB2; A4xB1.
Winners of quarterfinals play semifinals as follows: (A1/B4) x (A3/B2) ; (A2/B3) x (A4xB1).
At the finals, winners of semifinals play for the gold, and losers for the bronze.
The tournament implements very tight line-up restrictions: only twelve players are allowed, and no replacement is permitted, even in case of injuries.

Men's tournaments

Results summary

Participating nations
Legend
 – Champions
 – Runners-up
 – Third place
 – Fourth place
 – Did not enter / Did not qualify
 – Hosts
= – More than one team tied for that rank
Q – Qualified for forthcoming tournament

Women's tournaments

Results summary

Participating nations
Legend
 – Champions
 – Runners-up
 – Third place
 – Fourth place
 – Did not enter / Did not qualify
 – Hosts
= – More than one team tied for that rank
Q – Qualified for forthcoming tournament

Medal table
Defunct NOCs are shown in italic.
Sources:

Total

Medal table, men

Medal table, women

MVP by edition

Men
1984 – 
1988 – 
1992 – 
1996 – 
2000 – 
2004 – 
2008 – 
2012 – 
2016 – 
2020 –

Women
1984 – 
1988 – 
1992 – 
1996 – 
2000 – 
2004 – 
2008 – 
2012 – 
2016 – 
2020 –

Win–loss records

Men's tournament

Women's tournament

See also

Beach volleyball at the Summer Olympics
List of Olympic venues in volleyball
List of indoor volleyball world medalists
Volleyball at the Summer Paralympics

Notes

References

External links

Fédération Internationale de Volleyball – official website
Olympic Volleyball History– Comprehensive results for all tournaments.
International Olympic Committee – official website

 
Olympics
Sports at the Summer Olympics